The Alternative Democratic Movement (MODA) is a political party in the Dominican Republic.

History
The party was established on 25 November 2007 by Emilio Rivas. In the 2010 parliamentary elections it won a single seat in the Chamber of Deputies. After increasing its vote share to 2.1%, the party retained its seat in the 2016 elections.

References

2007 establishments in the Dominican Republic
Political parties established in 2007
Political parties in the Dominican Republic